Marife Necesito is a Filipino actress on stage, film, and television productions. After portraying several obscure roles, she was cast in the film Mammoth with Mexican actor Gael García Bernal and American actress Michelle Williams.

Early life and career
Necesito was born in Manila and raised in Valenzuela City, a suburb of Metro Manila which at that time was part of Bulacan Province.  After finishing high school at St. Jude Academy in Valenzuela's Malinta district, she pursued creative writing for Tagalog komiks and romance novels.  When the komiks industry went downhill, she then shifted to acting for theater where she was trained by senior thespians Cecile Guidote-Alvarez and Angie Ferro.  Her theatrical stint paved the way for her to act for television commercials and independent films.

Role in Mammoth
In Mammoth, Necesito portrays the role of Gloria, a mother of two sons who leaves the Philippines to work as a nanny of the daughter (Sophie Nyweide) of an American couple played by Gael García Bernal and Michelle Williams. When Bernal's character goes to Thailand for a business trip, he decides to change his life that would set off a chain of events that impact the rest of the family, including Gloria.  Necesito bested other local actresses in the auditions, which she revealed took more than a year, including Alessandra de Rossi, Chin Chin Gutierrez, Joyce Jimenez, and  Pinky Amador.  She said in an interview with Philippine Daily Inquirer that she considers Mammoth as her biggest break so far.

Filmography

References

External links

Filipino film actresses
Filipino television actresses
Living people
Filipino stage actresses
People from Manila
People from Valenzuela, Metro Manila
Actresses from Metro Manila
1980 births